KK Teodo (Montenegrin Cyrillic: КК Теодо) is a professional basketball club from Tivat, Montenegro. The team currently competes in Montenegrin Basketball League and regional BIBL League. A school for all ages and categories has been organized within the club.

Supporters

Teodo fans are known as Teodosi. The group's traditional colours are blue and yellow, which are also the colours of Teodo basketball club.

Honours

Domestic competitions

League

Runner up of the Montenegrin 1B League for the season 2008-2009

Regional competitions

Participation in BIBL League for the season 2012-13

Players

Current roster

Coaches

Sponsorships

External links
 Balkan League web site
 Eurobasket.com KK Teodo Tivat Page

Teodo
Basketball teams established in 2005
Tivat